Homecoming is an album by Gateway, a trio composed of John Abercrombie, Dave Holland and Jack DeJohnette. It was recorded in 1994 and released on the ECM label in 1995 and is the trio's first album since Gateway 2 in 1978.

Reception 

An AllMusic review by Greg Turner stated "The Gateway Trio is a cooperative in the greatest sense of the word... Even though this only the third Gateway recording and the group's first in 17 years, each group member collaborates frequently with the others. As a result there is always a great sense of interplay between Abercrombie's sometimes-mellow-sometimes-distorted guitar, Holland's huge toned bass, and DeJohnette's dancing drums... This is a fine return to recording for a great group". A separate AllMusic review by Scott Yanow stated: "the high improvisational level makes this a set deserving of close listens."

Regarding the album's title track, Tyran Grillo wrote: "The joy in every lick and tumble is in full evidence. DeJohnette is aflame, Abercrombie following his trail of embers with laser precision and shaving off an twist of lime for his solo, while Holland... is at his buoyant best." Concerning the album as a whole, he commented: "If only we could get a taste of this alchemy in our drink, we might all live beyond our time. Invigorating and fine, Homecoming is a joy to explore time and again."

Track listing 
 "Homecoming" (Holland) - 12:37  
 "Waltz New" (Abercrombie) - 8:32  
 "Modern Times" (Holland) - 7:31  
 "Calypso Falto" (Abercrombie) - 7:46  
 "Short Cut" (Abercrombie) - 6:12  
 "How's Never" (Holland) - 7:34  
 "In Your Arms" (Holland) - 5:48  
 "7th D" (DeJohnette) - 9:30  
 "Oneness" (DeJohnette) - 7:43

Personnel 
 John Abercrombie – guitar
 Jack DeJohnette – drums, piano
 Dave Holland – bass

References 

1995 albums
Gateway (band) albums
ECM Records albums
Albums produced by Manfred Eicher